Nellie Charlie (1867–1965) was a Mono Lake Paiute - Kucadikadi basketmaker associated with Yosemite National Park.  She was born in Lee Vining, California, the daughter of tribal headman Pete Jim, and his wife Patsy, also a basket maker.  She married Young Charlie, a Mono Lake Paiute - Kucadikadi man from Yosemite, and they had six children.  Her Paiute name was Besa-Yoona.

She worked in both traditional and modern basket styles, and participated in the annual Indian Field Days competition in Yosemite in the 1920s. Her daughter, Daisy Mallory, became a prominent weaver.

She was among a group of Paiute women who "became known for their exceedingly fine, visually stunning and complex polychrome baskets." Others in this group included Lucy Telles and Carrie Bethel.

She died in Bishop, California.

Legacy 
One of her baskets covered with beadwork using Czechoslovakian seed beads is in the collection of the Yosemite Museum.  This and a more traditional basket she made of sedge root were part of an exhibition on the art of Yosemite which appeared at the Autry National Center, the Oakland Museum of California, the Nevada Museum of Art and the Eiteljorg Museum of American Indians and Western Art from 2006 to 2008.

Gallery

See also
 List of Native American artists
 Visual arts by indigenous peoples of the Americas

Notes 

Native American basket weavers
Northern Paiute people
Artists from California
1867 births
1965 deaths
People from Mono County, California
20th-century American women artists
Native American women artists
Women basketweavers
20th-century Native Americans
20th-century Native American women
Native American people from California